"Beautiful Pain" is a song by Eminem featuring Sia, appearing as a bonus track on his 2013 album The Marshall Mathers LP 2, marking the first collaboration between the two musicians. They further collaborated on the song Guts Over Fear from Eminem's 2014 compilation album SHADYXV. Billboard described the song as an "emo-punched rap ballad", and one of Eminem's best collaborations with a female artist. In 2014, Spin ranked the song number 264 out of Eminem's 289 songs released to date.

Charts

References

2013 songs
Eminem songs
Sia (musician) songs
Songs written by Luis Resto (musician)
Songs written by Eminem
Songs written by Emile Haynie
Songs written by Sia (musician)